"Mun elämä" is a song by Finnish pop rock singer-songwriter Maija Vilkkumaa. Released by Warner Music Finland in 2003 as the second single from her third studio album Ei, the release included the B-side "Ne jotka tyytyy" (Those Who Don't Ask for More). Written by Vilkkumaa, the song peaked at number five on its second week on the Finnish Singles Chart and charted for seven weeks.

Track listing

References

2003 singles
Maija Vilkkumaa songs
Finnish-language songs
Songs written by Maija Vilkkumaa